SlickEdit, previously known as Visual SlickEdit, is a cross-platform commercial source code editor, text editor, code editor and Integrated Development Environment developed by SlickEdit, Inc. SlickEdit supports Integrated Debuggers for GNU C/C++, Java, WinDbg, Clang C/C++ LLDB, Groovy, Google Go, Python, Perl, Ruby, PHP, Xcode, and Android JVM/NDK. SlickEdit includes such features as built in beautifiers that can beautify code as you type, code navigation, context tagging (also known as Intelligent code completion), symbol references, third party tool integration, DiffZilla (a file differencing tool), syntax highlighting, and over 13 keyboard emulations.

In 2014, SlickEdit released a SlickEdit Standard version of their product and renamed their original product SlickEdit Pro.

History
SlickEdit began in 1988 as a character-mode editor for DOS and OS/2. Clark Maurer, currently CEO of SlickEdit Inc. (formerly MicroEdge Inc.), was employed at IBM's Watson research lab. He was the developer of the internal IBM editor E; the most popular internal program used at IBM at the time.  This experience enabled him to quit IBM and begin development of the first SlickEdit releases.

At the beginning of the 1990s, most DOS editors were struggling with limitations of the 16-bit address space or DOS memory handling (640k). SlickEdit's programmers found a way to overcome these limitations.  SlickEdit's current version can now handle large files of up to 2 TB in size.

As operating systems with graphical user interfaces became more popular, SlickEdit continued to produce versions of the program with high functionality and good usability.  Today SlickEdit is feature rich in C++, C#, Java, JavaScript, PHP, HTML, Objective-C, Groovy, Google Go, and many more.  SlickEdit can be used for everything from Web Development, IOS Development, Android software development, and Desktop Development to Mainframe Development.  SlickEdit supports debugging for GNU C/C++, Java, WinDbg, Groovy, Google Go, Python, Perl, Ruby, PHP, Xcode, and Android JVM/NDK.

Supported languages and operating systems

SlickEdit supports over 70 programming languages and file types, including C, C++, C#, Groovy (programming language), Java, JavaScript, Objective-C, Go, HTML, PHP, XML, Windows batch files, AWK, Makefiles and INI files. Some of these are only supported with syntax highlighting, such as Makefiles and INI files. Like most other code editors, SlickEdit allows the user to add support for additional languages and to modify the way it operates on the ones listed above.
SlickEdit also supports opening Visual Studio solutions and Xcode projects as workspaces. 

SlickEdit supports at least 76 different encodings and runs on seven operating systems:

 AIX
 HP-UX
 Linux
 macOS
 Microsoft Windows
 Solaris (SPARC and x86)

The 32-bit Linux SlickEdit binary can also run on a FreeBSD system which is configured for Linux binary compatibility, although this is not a supported configuration.

Until version 4.0b, SlickEdit supported the OS/2 operating system.

Slick-C
Slick-C is the proprietary scripting language of the editor. Much of the editor is actually written in Slick-C, and all the Slick-C source code is included with the product. This means that the user can look at how things work and modify the behavior to suit their needs.

As the name suggests, the language resembles C, though it has some elements from REXX (parse,  substr, ...). The original author of Slick-C liked the string parsing features of REXX and added similar features to Slick-C .

Support
In addition to direct support for customers, SlickEdit also hosts a web forum where users can help one another.

Reception
In a review of version 11 of SlickEdit, released in 2006, Tom Plunket reviewing it  for the Game Developer, suggested that it suffers from an overabundance of features:
In 2012, Shawn Powers also reviewed the software for the Linux Journal, concluding that it "is an amazing tool".

Related products
 SlickEdit Plug-In: Integrates the SlickEdit editor for use in the Eclipse IDE.

See also
 List of text editors
 Comparison of text editors

Further reading

References

External links
 

Code navigation tools
HTML editors
Text editors
MacOS text editors
Windows text editors
Unix text editors
Linux text editors